Félix-René Altmayer (1882–1976) was a French general. His father Victor Joseph Altmayer and elder brother Robert Altmayer were also generals. They were of German descent.

He commanded 5th Army Corps between 15 January and 20 June 1940, then the military region of Montpellier from 17 August 1940 to 7 February 1942, before being retired.

References

French generals
1882 births
1976 deaths
French Army generals of World War II